Simons' BASIC is an extension to BASIC 2.0 for the Commodore 64 home computer. Written by British programmer David Simons in 1983, who was 16 years old at the time, it was distributed by Commodore as a cartridge.

It is widely, but incorrectly, called "Simon's BASIC", because of confusion between the first name "Simon" and the surname "Simons".

[[File:Simon's BASIC cartridge.jpg|thumb|Cartridges, with the misspelled label contributing to the software's naming confusion.']]

 Features 

Simons' BASIC added an array of features to Commodore BASIC 2.0:
 114 additional keywords
 commands to ease the coding of sprites
 commands to ease the coding of high-resolution and multicolor graphics
 commands to ease the coding of sound
 commands to aid in structured programming
 keywords to assist in writing and editing BASIC programs, similar to those in the VIC-20 Programmer's Aid cartridge

Programs written in Simons' BASIC could employ hexadecimal numbers in assignments and calculations by including a  prefix, or binary numbers by utilizing a  prefix.

Because a portion of the cartridge data is mapped into memory at addresses , which overlaps part of the standard C64 BASIC RAM, the amount of available memory for BASIC programs was 8 KB less than that of a standard C64 configuration.

An extension was written by Simons and released by Commodore on floppy disk and tape as Simons' Basic Extension. This software is also known as Simons' Basic 2. It could not be released on cartridge because the original Simons' Basic cartridge had to be present in order to use the extension.

 The 114 keywords 

 Sprite (MOB) handling keywords 
 MOB SET – enables a sprite and defines its attributes
 MMOB – positions a sprite on the screen
 RLOCMOB – causes a sprite to smoothly move from one location to another
 CMOB – sets up the two global colors for multicolor sprites
 MOB OFF – disables a sprite
 DETECT – initializes sprite collision detection
 CHECK – checks for a sprite collision

 High resolution graphics handling keywords 
 HIRES – initializes a high-resolution graphics mode
 MULTI – initializes a multicolor graphics mode
 NRM – returns to the text display
 LOW COL – changes the plotting colors
 HI COL – returns to the original plotting colors
 PLOT – draws a pixel
 LINE – draws a line
 CIRCLE – draws a circle
 ARC – draws an arc
 ANGL – draws the radius of a circle
 PAINT – performs a flood fill
 REC – draws a hollow rectangle
 BLOCK – draws a solid rectangle
 DRAW – draws a user-defined set of lines
 ROT – sets scaling factors for DRAW
 CHAR – plots a text character on a high-resolution screen
 TEXT – plots a text string on a high-resolution screen
 TEST – determines whether a pixel is plotted or empty

 Other graphics handling keywords 
 COLOUR – sets the background and border colors; the British spelling is used
 CSET – selects a character set
 MEM – copies character ROM to RAM
 BCKGNDS – configures extended background color mode
 FLASH – sets up a screen color to flash
 OFF – cancels a previous FLASH directive
 BFLASH – causes the screen border to flash
 FCHR – fills an area of the text screen with a given character code
 FCOL – changes character colors for a selected area of the screen
 FILL – a combination of FCHR and FCOL
 MOVE – copies a section of the screen
 INV – displays a screen area in reverse
 LEFT – scrolls the screen left
 RIGHT – scrolls the screen right
 UP – scrolls the screen up
 DOWN – scrolls the screen down
 GRAPHICS – reserved variable that always equals $D000 (the VIC-II chip's base address)
 SCRSV – saves a text screen to tape or disk
 SCRLD – loads a text screen from tape or disk

 Sound handling keywords 
 MUSIC – plays a series of notes based on the contents of a string variable
 PLAY – determines whether the program continues to run during MUSIC
 VOL – specifies the master sound volume
 WAVE – specifies a voice type
 ENVELOPE – sets ADSR parameters for a SID voice
 SOUND – reserved variable that always equals $D400 (the SID chip's base address)

 Keyboard input handling keywords 
 FETCH – takes user input with restrictions defined by the command
 INKEY – checks for a function key press
 ON KEY – checks for a given keypress, then performs a branch if present
 DISABLE – disables the previous ON KEY directive
 RESUME – reenables the previous ON KEY directive

 Input peripheral handling keywords 
 JOY – reads a joystick
 POT – reads a paddle
 PENX – reads the light pen's horizontal position
 PENY – reads the light pen's vertical position

 Sprite/custom character definition keywords 
 @ – describes one line in a sprite or custom character graphic
 DESIGN – uses neighbouring @ lines to define a sprite or custom character

 Error trapping keywords 
 ON ERROR – sets up a routine to trap error conditions
 OUT – ends an error handling routine
 NO ERROR – cancels ON ERROR and restores normal BASIC error handling

 Disk handling keywords 
 DIR – displays the disk directory without destroying the BASIC program in memory (Drive #8 only)
 DISK – sends a string to the disk drive's command channel (Drive #8 only)

 Printer handling keywords 
 HRDCPY – sends the text screen to the printer
 COPY – sends the high-resolution screen to the printer

 String manipulation keywords 
 INSERT – inserts one string into the middle of another (Note: There is no dollar sign after INSERT, unlike other string operators such as STR$, LEFT$, RIGHT$, etc.)
 INST – similar to INSERT, but overwrites rather than inserting. (Note: As with INSERT, there is no dollar sign after INST.)
 PLACE – searches for one string in the middle of another
 DUP – duplicates a character string a given number of times. (Note: As with INSERT, there is no dollar sign after DUP.)

 Text formatting keywords 
 PRINT AT – prints a string at a given screen location
 CENTRE – centers a character string on the screen; the British spelling is used
 USE – formats numeric data in strings based on a template, just like PRINT USING on other advanced versions of BASIC on other computers, e.g. the Commodore 128, for example.
 LIN – returns the vertical position of the cursor

 Maths keywords 
Note: These operations are restricted to values that fit into a 16-bit unsigned integer, instead of the full floating-point range used by the built-in BASIC arithmetic operations and functions.
 MOD – performs a division operation and returns the remainder
 DIV – performs a division operation and returns the integer quotient
 FRAC – isolates the fractional portion of a number
 EXOR – performs an exclusive-OR logical operation

 Programmer's aid keywords 
 AUTO – automatically generates line numbers as a BASIC program is entered
 RENUMBER – renumbers a BASIC program (but does not fix GOTO/GOSUB statements.)
 OLD – undeletes a program accidentally removed by the NEW command
 KEY – assigns a string as a macro to a function key
 DISPLAY – displays all function key macros
 MERGE – merges a BASIC program from tape or disk into the program currently in memory
 PAGE – displays a BASIC program listing in page format
 OPTION – highlights Simons' BASIC keywords when using the LIST command
 DELAY – varies the rate at which the LIST command scrolls the screen
 FIND – searches the program for a string
 TRACE – displays the line numbers as a program is running
 RETRACE – displays results of a trace
 DUMP – displays all variable values except for arrays
 COLD – resets the C64

 Security-related keywords 
 DISAPA – marks a BASIC program line for hiding
 SECURE – hides all lines marked with DISAPA so that they cannot be viewed with LIST

 Structured programming keywords 
 ELSE – allows an alternative branch for IF/THEN conditionals
 REPEAT – start of a REPEAT/UNTIL loop structure
 UNTIL – defines the loop condition for a REPEAT/UNTIL loop structure, and marks its end
 RCOMP – reinstates the most recently used IF/THEN/ELSE conditional
 LOOP – defines the start of a loop that will run until an EXIT IF conditional is true
 EXIT IF – the conditional is true, so it exits the current LOOP/END LOOP structure
 END LOOP – defines the end of a loop that will run until an EXIT IF conditional is true
 PROC – defines the start of a named subroutine
 END PROC – defines the end of a named subroutine
 CALL – jump to a named subroutine defined with PROC/END PROC, and stay there
 EXEC – call a named subroutine defined with PROC/END PROC, then return
 LOCAL – redefines variables for use in structures
 GLOBAL – reverses the effects of a previous LOCAL command

 Miscellaneous keywords 
 CGOTO – equivalent to GOTO, but accepts calculated expressions
 RESET – moves the DATA pointer to a given line number
 PAUSE – pauses program execution for a specified number of seconds

 Other 
 $ and % are also considered keywords, for a total of 114.

 Trivia 
The band Barcelona titled their 1999 debut album Simon Basic in tribute. The album includes the song "C-64".

 Reception Creative Computing stated that Simons' BASIC "almost makes the 64 into a new computer. (Probably the one it should have been in the first place.)" It praised the "very fine manual" as a contrast to Commodore's usually poor documentation, and predicted that it would become "the standard language for programming the machine … Commodore had better be planning to manufacture lots of copies because they will go fast". Ahoy! wrote "If you do any programming in BASIC and should happen to see this product on a dealer's shelf, do not ask any questions—do not hesitate—just buy it!" The magazine praised Simons' BASIC's power and "excellent manual", and stated that "its price makes it one of the biggest bargains available for the Commodore 64". RUN''s review was less favorable, stating that its "many powerful and useful commands … were, unfortunately, implemented very poorly for a commercial package. There is very little command parameter checking, and many things have been overlooked or ignored."

The original SIMONS' BASIC cartridge (without the extension) has no provisions for reading the error channel on the Commodore 1541 and Commodore 1571 disk drives, nor can it perform a DIRectory listing of files or issue a DISK command on any disk drive other than Drive #8 when more than one disk drive is connected to the Commodore 64. And while most "standard" BASIC 2.0 keywords can be abbreviated by typing the first or first and second letters and then holding down the SHIFT key while typing the second (or third) letter after that, all SIMONS' BASIC keywords must be completely spelled out in full exactly as shown in the accompanying user's manual. This includes the commands COLOUR (which selects the background color and exterior border color), and CENTRE (which prints text message that are "centered" on the screen), both of which are spelled as in British English and are incorporated that way into SIMONS' BASIC.

References

External links 
 Simons' Basic User Guide on Internet Archive by David Simons, Commodore Computers, 1983. Downloadable as PDF.
 Simons' Basic Italian Reference Guide by David Simons, Commodore Editor, 1983.
 Lemon64 Forum topic with some informal information from David Simons himself.

1983 software
Commodore 64 software
BASIC extensions
CBM software